The Turnbridge Lift Bridge (also colloquially known as a Locomotive lift bridge) is a lift bridge which spans the Huddersfield Broad Canal at Turnbridge, Kirklees, West Yorkshire, England. Officially known as Turnbridge, it is bridge number 17 on the Huddersfield Broad Canal.

Located at Quay Street, off St Andrews road (approx 300 Yards from the town centre), it opened in 1865 and replaced an earlier swing bridge. A combination of wheels, chains and counter-weights were used to lift the deck of the bridge out of the way of passing canal barges.

Previously windlass operated, it was refurbished in 2002 and is now electrically powered.

See also
List of Bridges for other notable bridges

References

Bridges in West Yorkshire
Vertical lift bridges
Vertical lift bridges in the United Kingdom
Buildings and structures in Kirklees
Bridges completed in 1865
Scheduled monuments in West Yorkshire